Sam Britton is a former Republican member of the Mississippi Public Service Commission representing the Southern District since his election in 2015 to replace the outgoing Steve Renfroe. The Southern District includes Adams, Amite, Clarke, Covington, Forrest, Franklin, George, Greene, Hancock, Harrison, Jackson, Jasper, Jones, Jefferson Davis, Lamar, Lawrence, Lincoln, Marion, Pearl River, Perry, Pike, Simpson, Smith, Stone, Walthall, Wayne and Wilkinson counties.

Biography
Sam Britton grew up in Waynesboro, Mississippi where his mother worked in the school lunch room and drove a school bus. His father worked in the oil industry as a roughneck. Neither parent attended college but both instilled the value of hard work and the importance of education in their children as all five graduated from college, four going on to earn master's degrees.

Britton graduated from Jones County Junior College before attending the University of Southern Mississippi where he completed a business degree. After school, he worked with his uncle in their pipeline construction business.  After the oil shock of the early 1980s, Britton returned to school and completed a degree in accounting, his second bachelor's degree from University of Southern Mississippi.
After receiving an accounting degree and completing the requirements necessary to become a Certified Public Accountant, Britton started his own accounting firm.

In his combined thirty years of experience in finance and accounting, Britton has held positions within the offices of the State Auditor and State Tax Commission. While working as a CPA and in his role as Public Service Commissioner, Britton often speaks to university business students and various community groups on finance and government.

Britton also holds certifications in areas including Accredited in Business Valuation, Certified Valuation Analyst, Certification in Financial Forensics, Personal Financial Specialist, Chartered Global Management Accountancy, and Charter Mergers & Acquisition and was recognized by the Mississippi Business Journal in 2014 as a "Mississippi Leader in Finance."

Britton has completed several marathons including the Marine Corps Marathon in Washington, D.C., The New York City Marathon and the San Francisco Marathon.

Elections
Britton was elected Mississippi Public Service Commissioner for the Southern District in November 2015 with over 60% of the vote defeating Democratic candidate Tom Blanton and Reform candidate Lonny Spence. He ran for Secretary of State of Mississippi in the 2019 Mississippi elections, but lost to Michael Watson.

References

External links
 Official Website at Mississippi Public Service Commission
 Campaign Website

Mississippi Republicans
University of Southern Mississippi alumni
Living people
Year of birth missing (living people)